Telefe Internacional is the international signal of Argentine television channel Telefe. It broadcasts television programs produced by Telefe, mostly consisting of telenovelas, series, comedies, teen and children's series, etc. It is available in countries outside Argentina. In the US and some territories, the channel is distributed by Paramount Media Networks.

History
Telefe Internacional was launched in 1998. It has been operating satellite television channels world-wide, including in Asia, America, Europe, Oceania and Canada, Israel broadcasts novels, series, entertainment, news and sports programming produced by Telefe, to Argentinian and Spanish-speaking people. It has only an international feed which has the time of Buenos Aires.

In Latin America, it has been available on DirecTV since 2007. It is available in Colombia, Peru and Venezuela through Movistar TV, and in Mexico through Totalplay and Axtel TV, plus a handful cable and satellite operators. An HD simulcast is available on VTR in Chile and Movistar TV.

In Spain, Telefe International is available in Movistar Plus+. In Israel, Hot has the signal since 2008, for the Hispanic community.

In United States, it arrived in 2001. Now Telefe International is available nationwide via satellite services (Dish Network, and DirecTV) and in cable operators, (Comcast, Cablevision, etc.). It is present in New York City, Miami, Washington, D.C., New Jersey, Florida, Los Angeles, Boston and in other cities. In Canada, Telus TV, Bell Satellite TV, Shaw Cable added the channel on April 16, 2015.

Programming
Telefe Internacional broadcasts news bulletins, sports news, soap operas, comedies, series, teen and children's series, entertainment programs, magazines, etc.

Telenovelas
Graduados
Dulce amor
La Leona
Somos Familia
Montecristo
Educando a Nina

Series
Aliados
Historia Clínica
Los Simuladores
Historia de un clan
Entre Caníbales

Entertainment
MasterChef Argentina
Elegidos (La música en tus manos)
Tu cara me suena
Peligro sin codificar

Children
Chiquititas

Magazines
AM
Morfi, todos a la mesa
UPlay
Íntimo

News
Telefe Noticias

Sports
El Deportivo

Travels
Aislados
Descubrir América

Cultural
Sabores de Campo

References

External links
Official website
Content sales (In English)

 
Television networks in Argentina
Television channels and stations established in 1998
Television stations in Argentina
Broadcasting in Argentina
Spanish-language television stations
Latin American cable television networks
International broadcasters
Paramount International Networks
Mass media in Buenos Aires